is a former Japanese football player.

Playing career
Segawa was born in Kurihara on November 26, 1974. After graduating from high school, he joined Yokohama Flügels in 1993. However he could not play at all in the match. In 1995, he moved to Japan Football League (JFL) club Fukushima FC. However the club was disbanded end of 1997 season due to financial strain. In 1998, he moved to his local club Brummell Sendai (later Vegalta Sendai) in JFL. He played as regular player and the club was promoted to J2 League in 1999. However he could hardly play in the match from 2000 and he retired end of 2001 season.

Club statistics

References

External links

1974 births
Living people
Association football people from Miyagi Prefecture
Japanese footballers
J1 League players
J2 League players
Japan Football League (1992–1998) players
Yokohama Flügels players
Fukushima FC players
Vegalta Sendai players
Association football forwards